The 2013–14 Four Hills Tournament took place at the four traditional venues of Oberstdorf, Garmisch-Partenkirchen, Innsbruck and Bischofshofen, located in Germany and Austria, between 29 December 2013 and 6 January 2014.

Results

Oberstdorf
 HS 137 Schattenbergschanze, Germany
29 December 2013

Garmisch-Partenkirchen
 HS 140 Große Olympiaschanze, Germany
1 January 2014

Innsbruck
 HS 130 Bergiselschanze, Austria
4 January 2014

Bischofshofen
 HS 140 Paul-Ausserleitner-Schanze, Austria
6 January 2014

Overall standings
The final standings after all four events:[

References

External links 
 

Four Hills Tournament
Four Hills Tournament, 2013-14
Four Hills Tournament, 2013-14
Four Hills Tournament, 2013-14
Four Hills Tournament, 2013-14
Four Hills Tournament